Manolita Saval (5 February 1914 in Paris, France – 23 August 2001 in Mexico City, Mexico) was a Spanish actress and singer.

Family and life
She was born in Paris of Spanish parents and named 'Juana María Saval'.

She was the mother of the actor Manuel Saval, and the niece of the Spanish opera singer Vicente Ballester Aparício.

Saval died in Mexico City on August 23, 2001 of cardiac arrest due to thrombosis.

Career
She studied music and drama in Spain, and began her career performing the opera Marina in Valencia. As a lyric interpreter, she toured Latin America, eventually settling in Mexico in 1938. Over the course of her career, she appeared in over 30 films and television programs, as well as in plays, operettas, and operas.

Recognition
In a review of her film debut in El capitán aventurero, the New York Times described her as "a new and charming Mexican actress."

Filmography

Film
 El capitán aventurero (1939) as Carmina
 Papacito lindo (1939) as Paquita Moreno
 Poor Devil (1940)
 El que tenga un amor (1942)
 Virgen de medianoche (1942)
 Esa mujer es la mía (1942)
 El baisano Jalil (1942) as Marta
 María Eugenia (1943) as Raquel
 Ojos negros (1943)
 Adiós juventud (1943)
 Amores de ayer (1944)
 Los miserables (1944) as Cosetta Ponchelevan
 El capitán Malacara (1945)
 La culpable (1946)
 Por un amor (1946)
 Fantasía ranchera (1947)
 Hijos de la mala vida (1949)
 Arrabalera (1951)
 Del suelo no paso (1959)
 Dos criados malcriados (1960)
 Esta noche no (1966) as Mama Sara
 Santa (1969)
 El ministro y yo (1976) as Estrellita
 La guerra de los pasteles (1979)

Television
 Un amor en la sombra (1960)
 Divorciadas (1961)
 La duda (1967)
 La casa de las fieras (1967) as Mercedes
 El padre Guernica (1968)
 La hiena (1973)
 Mundo de juguete (1974)
 Querer volar (1980) as Paquita
 Vivir enamorada (1982) as Merceditas
 Madres egoístas (1 episode, 1991) as Rosario
 Muchachitas (1991) as Enriqueta
 El abuelo y yo (1992)
 Hasta que la muerte los separe (1 episode, 1994) as Manolita

References

External links 
 
 https://www.youtube.com/watch?v=reuahlM8GIE "Manolita Saval en El que tenga un amor"
 https://www.youtube.com/watch?v=dKGPgcTDbqY "Manolita Saval y Emilio Tuero en El que tenga un amor"

1914 births
2001 deaths
Mexican film actresses
Mexican stage actresses
Mexican telenovela actresses
Actresses from Paris
Spanish emigrants to Mexico
Deaths from thrombosis
20th-century French women
Spanish expatriates in France